The Raid on Lepka took place in April 1957 as part of the Cyprus Emergency. British security forces attacked an EOKA guerrilla group in the mountains and captured seven leading EOKA officers including leader Georghis Demetriou and Mikkis Frillas.

References

Cyprus Emergency
1957 in Cyprus
Conflicts in 1957
April 1957 events in Europe
Military operations involving the United Kingdom